Rosenthal Heights is a rural residential locality in the Southern Downs Region, Queensland, Australia.

History 
The locality takes its name from the parish, which in turn derived its name from a pastoral run name used by wool grower Frederick John Bracker in the early 1840s, from the German rosen meaning roses and thal meaning valley or glen.

In 1877,  of land was resumed from the Rosenthal pastoral run to establish smaller farms. The land was offered for selection on 19 April 1877.

Inverleigh State School opened on 6 October 1921 and closed on 21 July 1942.

References

Further reading 

  — includes Inverleigh School, Allan / Sandy Creek School, Rookwood School, Mountside School, Rosenthal School, and Rose Hill School.

Southern Downs Region
Localities in Queensland